MP3 is M. Pokora's third studio album, which was released March 24, 2008 in France and will be available in 27 countries. The album is available in three editions: original, limited, and collector's. The limited edition contains two bonus tracks, and the collector's edition comes with a lanyard, poster and four badges.

Timbaland and Ryan Leslie participated in this album. 
Recorded in Los Angeles, most tracks are in English, except two which are in French. The bonus tracks on the limited edition are the English version of the two French songs. During the interview with hitparade.ch, M. Pokora stated that French limited himself and his music from being internationally spread, although the album does not directly aim for his international career.

Track listing

Charts

Release history

References

2008 albums
M. Pokora albums
Albums produced by Timbaland
Albums produced by Ryan Leslie